Parkway is a suburb of Wainuiomata, part of Lower Hutt city situated in the lower North Island of New Zealand.

Demographics

Wainuiomata West had a population of 3,570 at the 2018 New Zealand census, an increase of 138 people (4.0%) since the 2013 census, and an increase of 234 people (7.0%) since the 2006 census. There were 1,200 households. There were 1,740 males and 1,827 females, giving a sex ratio of 0.95 males per female. The median age was 34.8 years (compared with 37.4 years nationally), with 753 people (21.1%) aged under 15 years, 786 (22.0%) aged 15 to 29, 1,608 (45.0%) aged 30 to 64, and 417 (11.7%) aged 65 or older.

Ethnicities were 65.8% European/Pākehā, 22.5% Māori, 17.1% Pacific peoples, 12.8% Asian, and 1.9% other ethnicities (totals add to more than 100% since people could identify with multiple ethnicities).

The proportion of people born overseas was 22.0%, compared with 27.1% nationally.

Although some people objected to giving their religion, 46.1% had no religion, 38.9% were Christian, 3.4% were Hindu, 0.4% were Muslim, 1.1% were Buddhist and 3.1% had other religions.

Of those at least 15 years old, 381 (13.5%) people had a bachelor or higher degree, and 621 (22.0%) people had no formal qualifications. The median income was $33,600, compared with $31,800 nationally. The employment status of those at least 15 was that 1,569 (55.7%) people were employed full-time, 363 (12.9%) were part-time, and 129 (4.6%) were unemployed.

Education
Wainuiomata High School is a state secondary (Year 9–13) school, and has  students. It was established in 2002 following the merger of Parkway College and Wainuiomata College.

Wainuiomata Intermediate School is a state intermediate (Year 7–8) school, and has  students. It was established in 2002 following the merger of Parkway Intermediate School and Wainuiomata Intermediate School.

Konini Primary School is a state contributing primary (Year 1–6) school in and has  students. It was established in 2002 following the merger of Parkway School and Sun Valley School.

All these schools are coeducational. Rolls are as of

References

Suburbs of Lower Hutt